Kostyukevich is an East Slavic language surname.

Notable people with the surname include:

 Frants Kostyukevich (born 1963), male race walker who represented the USSR and later Belarus
 Lyudmila Kostyukevich (1964), Belarusian former speed skater
 Yevgeniy Kostyukevich (born 1989), Belarusian former professional footballer

Belarusian-language surnames
Russian-language surnames